The Waiting Room is a 2012 American documentary film and social media project directed by Peter Nicks that follows the life and times of patients, doctors, and staff at Highland Hospital, a safety-net hospital in Oakland, California.

Summary
The project includes a blog which features stories and conversations from the waiting room as well as behind-the-scenes information about the project. Frequent video updates from the project are posted on the blog. These videos examine what life is like in an American public hospital caring for a community of largely uninsured patients.

The project involves placing interactive storytelling booths in hospital waiting rooms. These kiosks will include the live-blogged reports from people living without health insurance, and a unique online portal that will distribute these stories and become an archive for the testimonials that will highlight the urgency of the national dialogue around health care.

Production
The Waiting Room is funded by the MacArthur Foundation, Independent Television Service, The Fledgling Fund, The San Francisco Foundation, California Council for the Humanities, the Pacific Pioneer Find, and the San Francisco Film Society. Its key partners include the Bay Area Video Coalition, Active Voice, Pentagram, and The Takeaway. The Waiting Room has also been featured on the New York Times Lens Blog as Videos Worth Watching.

Critical reception
Both The Washington Post and the San Francisco Chronicle named the film on the 10 Best of the Year lists. Critic Ann Hornaday of The Washington Post named The Waiting Room the third best film of 2012. Wrote Hornaday: "This subtle, compassionate tableau lifts the veil on a world often described in terms of squalor and despair, finding the inherent dignity and perseverance therein."
The movie holds a "fresh" rating of 100% on Rotten Tomatoes based on 34 reviews, with a weighted average of 8.41/10.

References

External links
 
 
 Oakland Local
 BAVC article on The Waiting Room
 Highland Hospital
 BAVC Video About The Waiting Room
 The Waiting Room page on ITVS website

American documentary films
2012 films
2012 documentary films
2010s English-language films
Films set in the San Francisco Bay Area
Documentary films about health care
Healthcare in Oakland, California
2010s American films